Beltinci Sports Park is a multi-purpose stadium in Beltinci, Slovenia. It is used mostly for football matches and is the home ground of the Slovenian Second League team ND Beltinci.

See also
List of football stadiums in Slovenia

References

External links
Soccerway profile

Football venues in Slovenia
Multi-purpose stadiums in Slovenia
Sports venues completed in 1959
1959 establishments in Slovenia